Exocelina is a genus of beetles in the family Dytiscidae, containing the following species:

Exocelina abdita (Balke, Watts, Cooper, Humphreys & Vogler, 2004) 
Exocelina aipo (Balke, 1998)
Exocelina aipomek (Balke, 1998)
Exocelina alexanderi Shaverdo, Hendrich & Balke in Shaverdo, Surbakti, Hendrich & Balke, 2012
Exocelina ascendens (Balke, 1998)
Exocelina astrophallus (Balke, 1998)
Exocelina atowaso Shaverdo, Sagata & Balke, 2005
Exocelina atra (Sharp, 1882)
Exocelina aubei (Montrouzier, 1860)
Exocelina atratus (J.Balfour-Browne, 1939)
Exocelina atripennis (J.Balfour-Browne, 1939)
Exocelina australiae (Clark, 1863)
Exocelina australis (Clark, 1863)
Exocelina bacchusi (Balke, 1998)
Exocelina bagus (Balke & Hendrich, 2001)
Exocelina baliem (Hendrich & Balke, 2013)
Exocelina bewaniensis Shaverdo, Menufandu & Balke, 2014
Exocelina bifida Shaverdo, Hendrich & Balke in Shaverdo, Surbakti, Hendrich & Balke, 2012
Exocelina bimaculata (Perroud & Montrouzier, 1864)
Exocelina bismarckensis Shaverdo & Balke, 2014
Exocelina boulevardi (Watts, 1978)
Exocelina brahminensis Shaverdo, Hendrich & Balke in Shaverdo, Surbakti, Hendrich & Balke, 2012
Exocelina broschii (Balke, 1998)
Exocelina brownei (Guignot, 1942)
Exocelina brunoi Wewalka, Balke & Hendrich, 2010
Exocelina casuarina (Balke & Hendrich, 1998)
Exocelina commatifera (Heller, 1916)
Exocelina craterensis Shaverdo & Balke, 2014
Exocelina creuxorum Wewalka, Balke & Hendrich, 2010
Exocelina damantiensis (Balke, 1998)
Exocelina danae (Balke, 1998)
Exocelina elongatula (W.J. Macleay, 1871)
Exocelina erteldi (Balke, 1998)
Exocelina evelyncheesmanae Shaverdo, Hendrich & Balke in Shaverdo, Surbakti, Hendrich & Balke, 2012
Exocelina ferruginea (Sharp, 1882)
Exocelina feryi Wewalka, Balke & Hendrich, 2010
Exocelina flammi Wewalka, Balke & Hendrich, 2010
Exocelina gapa (Watts, 1978)
Exocelina gaulorum Wewalka, Balke & Hendrich, 2010
Exocelina gelima Wewalka, Balke & Hendrich, 2010
Exocelina glypta (Guignot, 1955)
Exocelina gorokaensis Shaverdo & Balke, 2014
Exocelina gracilis (Sharp, 1882)
Exocelina hansferyi Shaverdo, Hendrich & Balke in Shaverdo, Surbakti, Hendrich & Balke, 2012
Exocelina heidiae (Balke, 1998)
Exocelina herowana Shaverdo & Balke, 2014
Exocelina hintelmannae Shaverdo, Sagata & Balke, 2005
Exocelina inexspectata Wewalka, Balke & Hendrich, 2010
Exocelina interrupta (Perroud & Montrouzier, 1864)
Exocelina irianensis Shaverdo, Hendrich & Balke in Shaverdo, Surbakti, Hendrich & Balke, 2012
Exocelina jaseminae (Balke, 1998)
Exocelina jimiensis Shaverdo & Balke, 2014
Exocelina kainantuensis (Balke, 2001)
Exocelina kakapupu Shaverdo, Hendrich & Balke in Shaverdo, Surbakti, Hendrich & Balke, 2012
Exocelina karmurensis (Balke, 1998)
Exocelina ketembang (Balke, 1998)
Exocelina kinibeli Shaverdo & Balke, 2014
Exocelina kisli Shaverdo & Balke, 2014
Exocelina knoepfchen Shaverdo, Hendrich & Balke in Shaverdo, Surbakti, Hendrich & Balke, 2012
Exocelina koghis Wewalka, Balke & Hendrich, 2010
Exocelina kolleri Wewalka, Balke & Hendrich, 2010
Exocelina ksionseki Shaverdo & Balke, 2014
Exocelina larsoni (Balke, 1998)
Exocelina leae Wewalka, Balke & Hendrich, 2010
Exocelina lembena Shaverdo & Balke, 2014
Exocelina lilianae Wewalka, Balke & Hendrich, 2010
Exocelina maculata (Sharp, 1882)
Exocelina madangensis (Balke, 2001)
Exocelina manfredi (Balke, 1998)
Exocelina mantembu Shaverdo & Balke, 2014
Exocelina me (Balke, 1998)
Exocelina melanaria (Sharp, 1882)
Exocelina messeri (Balke, 1999)
Exocelina michaelensis Shaverdo & Balke, 2014
Exocelina miriae (Balke, 1998)
Exocelina monae (Balke, 1998)
Exocelina monteithi Wewalka, Balke & Hendrich, 2010
Exocelina munaso Shaverdo, Sagata & Balke, 2005
Exocelina nielsi Wewalka, Balke & Hendrich, 2010
Exocelina niklasi Wewalka, Balke & Hendrich, 2010
Exocelina nomax (J.Balfour-Browne, 1939)
Exocelina novaecaledoniae (J.Balfour-Browne, 1939)
Exocelina oceai Shaverdo, Hendrich & Balke in Shaverdo, Surbakti, Hendrich & Balke, 2012
Exocelina ouin Wewalka, Balke & Hendrich, 2010
Exocelina parvulus (Boisduval, 1835)
Exocelina patepensis (Balke, 1998)
Exocelina perfectus (Sharp, 1882)
Exocelina pinocchio Shaverdo & Balke, 2014
Exocelina poellabauerae Wewalka, Balke & Hendrich, 2010
Exocelina polita (Sharp, 1882)
Exocelina pseudoastrophallus Shaverdo & Balke, 2014
Exocelina pseudobifida Shaverdo & Balke, 2014
Exocelina pseudoedeltraudae Shaverdo & Balke, 2014
Exocelina pseudosoppi Shaverdo, Hendrich & Balke in Shaverdo, Surbakti, Hendrich & Balke, 2012
Exocelina punctipennis (Lea, 1899)
Exocelina rasjadi Watts & Humphreys, 2009
Exocelina remyi Wewalka, Balke & Hendrich, 2010
Exocelina rasilis (Lea, 1899)
Exocelina rivula (Balke, 1998)
Exocelina rotteri Wewalka, Balke & Hendrich, 2010
Exocelina rufa (Balke, 1998)
Exocelina sanctimontis (Balke, 1998)
Exocelina schoelleri Wewalka, Balke & Hendrich, 2010
Exocelina shizong (Balke & Bergsten, 2003)
Exocelina simbaiarea Shaverdo & Balke, 2014
Exocelina simoni Wewalka, Balke & Hendrich, 2010
Exocelina simplex (Clark, 1863)
Exocelina skalei Shaverdo & Balke, 2014
Exocelina soppi Shaverdo, Hendrich & Balke in Shaverdo, Surbakti, Hendrich & Balke, 2012
Exocelina staneki Wewalka, Balke & Hendrich, 2010
Exocelina subjecta (Sharp, 1882)
Exocelina takime (Balke, 1998)
Exocelina talaki (Balke, 1998)
Exocelina tariensis Shaverdo & Balke, 2014
Exocelina tarmluensis (Balke, 1998)
Exocelina ullrichi (Balke, 1998)
Exocelina unipo Shaverdo, Hendrich & Balke in Shaverdo, Surbakti, Hendrich & Balke, 2012
Exocelina vladimiri Shaverdo, Sagata & Balke, 2005
Exocelina vovai Shaverdo & Balke, 2014
Exocelina waigeoensis Shaverdo, Hendrich & Balke in Shaverdo, Surbakti, Hendrich & Balke, 2012
Exocelina wannangensis Shaverdo & Balke, 2014
Exocelina weylandensis Shaverdo, Hendrich & Balke in Shaverdo, Surbakti, Hendrich & Balke, 2012
Exocelina wondiwoiensis Shaverdo, Hendrich & Balke in Shaverdo, Surbakti, Hendrich & Balke, 2012

References

Dytiscidae genera